Kanikula Glacier., also known as Little Tokositna Glacier, is an  long glacier in the Alaska Range of Denali National Park and Preserve in the U.S. state of Alaska. The glacier originates in a series of glacial amphitheaters in the south side of the range, moving southeast past Mount Goldie and ending before the valley of Tokositna Glacier. Variant forms and spellings of the name include K'enik'ela Li'a, Kahnicula Glacier, Kanicula Glacier and Little Tokasitna Glacier.

See also
 List of glaciers

References

Glaciers of Matanuska-Susitna Borough, Alaska
Glaciers of Denali National Park and Preserve
Glaciers of Alaska